Amblyseius animos is a species of mite in the Phytoseiidae family. It was described by A.S. Khan, M. Afzal and Shamshad Akbar in 2000, and is known from Pakistan.

References

animos
Animals described in 2000
Invertebrates of Pakistan